Jessiefjellet is a mountain in Prins Karls Forland, Svalbard. It has a height above mean sea level of 1,033 with a pointed summit. It is named after Jessie Bruce, wife of Scottish Arctic explorer William S. Bruce. 
Jessiefjellet is part of the Grampianfjella mountain ridge.

References

Mountains of Prins Karls Forland